The National Museum of Denmark (Nationalmuseet) in Copenhagen is Denmark's largest museum of cultural history, comprising the histories of Danish and foreign cultures, alike. The museum's main building is located a short distance from Strøget at the center of Copenhagen. It contains exhibits from around the world, from Greenland to South America. Additionally, the museum sponsors SILA - The Greenland Research Center at the National Museum of Denmark to further archaeological and anthropological research in Greenland.

The museum has a number of national commitments, particularly within the following key areas: archaeology, ethnology, numismatics, ethnography, natural science, conservation, communication, building antiquarian activities in connection with the churches of Denmark, as well as the handling of the Danefæ (the National Treasures).

Exhibitions
The museum covers 14,000 years of Danish history, from the reindeer-hunters of the Ice Age, Vikings, and works of religious art from the Middle Ages, when the church was highly significant in Danish life. Danish coins from Viking times to the present and coins from ancient Rome and Greece, as well as examples of the coinage and currencies of other cultures, are exhibited also. The National Museum keeps Denmark's largest and most varied collection of objects from the ancient cultures of Greece and Italy, the Near East and Egypt. For example, it holds a collection of objects that were retrieved during the Danish excavation of Tell Shemshara in Iraq in 1957.

Exhibits are also shown on who the Danish people are and were, stories of everyday life and special occasions, stories of the Danish state and nation, but most of all stories of different people's lives in Denmark from 1560 to 2000.

The Danish pre-history section was re-opened in May 2008 after years of renovating.

In 2013, a major exhibition on the Vikings was opened by Margrethe II of Denmark. It has toured to other museums, including the British Museum in London.

Notable artifacts
Golden horns of Gallehus (only copies are on display since the originals were stolen and melted down in 1802)
Gundestrup cauldron
Hjortspring boat
Egtved Girl coffin
Kingittorsuaq Runestone
Snoldelev Stone
Trundholm Sun Chariot
Seikilos epitaph
Holmegaard bow
Tjele helmet fragment

Directors
Christian Jürgensen Thomsen (1825–1865)
Jens Jacob Asmussen Worsaae (1856–1874)
Sophus Müller (1895–1921)
Olaf Olsen (1981–1995)
Steen Hvass (1996–2001)
Carsten U. Larsen (2002–2008)
Per Kristian Madsen (2008–2017)
Rane Willerslev (2017–present)

Gallery
<

Publications (selected)
Nationalmuseets Arbejdsmark is the title of the museum's yearbook which has been published since 1928 and contains articles and other contributions. ISSN 0084-9308

Nationalmuseets Arbejdsmark 1807 - 2007. København: Nationalmuseet, 2007

See also
Dankirke
Frilandsmuseet
Frøslev
The Lewis Collection
Liselund Manor
Lille Mølle, Christianshavn
Rømø
List of museums in Denmark

References

External links

Virtual tour of the National Museum of Denmark provided by Google Arts & Culture

 
1819 establishments in Denmark
Archaeological museums in Denmark
History museums in Denmark
Denmark
Museums in Copenhagen
Viking Age museums
Rococo architecture in Denmark